Walton Chaintech Corporation, founded in November 1986, is a Taiwanese computer hardware manufacturer.

The company was known as Chaintech Computer Co. Ltd. but renamed itself Walton Chaintech Corporation in October 2005.

Chaintech employs approximately 1,100 people. It is best known for manufacturing graphics cards and motherboards, although it also produces sound cards, modems and memory modules. Besides its Taipei headquarters in Taiwan, Chaintech has eight branch offices in Hong Kong, Beijing and Shenzhen (China), Korea, Sydney (Australia), California (United States), Paris (France) and Moscow (Russia).

In 2012, Walton Chaintech returned to motherboard and graphics card businesses.

See also
 List of companies of Taiwan

External links 
 
 List of Chaintech motherboards
 News of motherboard phase out - xbitlabs.com
 Returns to Motherboard and Graphics Card Businesses

Manufacturing companies established in 1986
Graphics hardware companies
Motherboard companies
Electronics companies of Taiwan
Manufacturing companies based in Taipei
Taiwanese companies established in 1986
Taiwanese brands